Huánuco District is one of twelve districts of the province Huánuco in Peru.

See also 
 Administrative divisions of Peru
 Killa Rumi

References

External links